"Triple Threat" is a song by American rapper, producer, singer-songwriter Missy Elliott featuring a guest appearance by childhood friend and longtime collaborator Timbaland. Originally, a snippet of the song premiered in March 2012 during Timbaland's appearance on SXSW. This song, along with the accompanying "9th Inning," were both released as promotional singles on September 18, 2012.

Critical reception
In a retrospetive review of the song, Steven J. Horowitz fom Vulture wrote: "Sweeping strings introduce "Triple Threat," the other A-side to 2012's "9th Inning." Elliott isn’t heard until a minute into the track, and aside from her palpable verses, Timbaland holds court for the majority, circling the hook, “Missy and I going up, triple leader in our cup"."

Charts

References

2012 singles
Timbaland songs
Missy Elliott songs
Songs written by Missy Elliott
Song recordings produced by Timbaland
Song recordings produced by Jerome "J-Roc" Harmon
Songs written by Timbaland
2012 songs
Atlantic Records singles